Kenneth Frank Baker (June 3, 1908–April 16, 1996) was an American phytopathologist (plant disease researcher). In his early career he held a number of positions with the United States Forest Service and United States Department of Agriculture. Following a three-year period in Hawaii researching pineapple pathogens, he accepted a position at the University of California, Los Angeles, where he remained for twenty-one years. He was elected as a fellow of the American Association for the Advancement of Science in 1950 and as a fellow of the American Phytopathological Society in 1969. Additionally, he served as the editor of the Annual Review of Phytopathology for five years.

Early life and education 
Kenneth Frank Baker was born in Ashton, South Dakota on June 3, 1908 to parents May  and Frank Baker. While he was young, his family moved from Ashton to Clarkston, Washington. He had one brother, G. Orien Baker, who also later earned a PhD related to botany. He attended Washington State University, graduating in 1930 with his bachelor's degree and 1934 with his PhD.

Career 
He spent the summer before beginning college and two summer breaks during his undergraduate working for the United States Forest Service (USFS). He worked at the Selway National Forest at Kooskia, Idaho doing trail maintenance, fire reporting, and construction of a fire lookout tower. He also documented the plants growing on the western slopes of the Bitterroot Range. The summer before his senior year, he worked in Elma, Washington at a plant nursery and greenhouse. At this time, it is likely he developed his interest in diseases affecting ornamental plants. While a PhD student, he spent his summers as a laboratory assistant at the university and then with the USFS at Clearwater National Forest controlling for the rust fungus. After finishing his PhD, his first job was at the USDA Bureau of Plant Industry where he searched for evidence of Cenangium fungal infections in ponderosa pines. He then completed a post-doctoral research appointment at the University of Wisconsin with Benjamin Minge Duggar. His next position saw his return to the USDA Bureau of Plant Industry where he worked to address diseases affecting windbreak trees in Nebraska, specifically root diseases and soilborne pathogens, including damping off. From 1936–1939, he worked in Hawaii with the Pineapple Producers Cooperative Association. He researched various pathogens that affected pineapple cultivation, including root rot caused by the fungi Pythium and Phytophthora and heart rot. He then worked at the University of California, Los Angeles from 1940–1961, transferring to University of California, Berkeley in 1961. Baker retired from UC Berkeley in 1975; he moved to Oregon to be a courtesy professor emeritus at Oregon State University and a collaborator for the USDA Agricultural Research Service.

The American Phytopathological Society noted that his 1957 publication The U.C. System for Producing Healthy Container-Grown Plants "revolutionized the nursery industry". Baker was part of the editorial board of the Annual Review of Phytopathology from its inception in 1963. He later served as its editor from 1972–1977.

Awards and honors 
Baker was elected to numerous scientific societies, including as a fellow of the American Association for the Advancement of Science in 1950 and as a fellow of the American Phytopathological Society in 1969. Additionally, he was named to the Horticultural Hall of Fame in 1976.

Personal life and death 
While getting his bachelor's degree, he was co-captain of the debate team and traveled widely for competitions.  He was first married to Dorothy Velma  in 1936. His second marriage was to Katharine Cummings from 1944 until her death in 1992. He was married to Kathryn Brock Hoffman Baker from 1992 until his death in 1996. He died on April 16, 1996 in Albany, Oregon at the age of 87.

References 

1908 births
1996 deaths
People from Spink County, South Dakota
Washington State University alumni
University of California, Los Angeles faculty
University of California, Berkeley faculty
American phytopathologists
Fellows of the American Association for the Advancement of Science
Annual Reviews (publisher) editors
20th-century agronomists